Lida Persili (Lombardy, 19th century) was an Italian painter, mainly of landscapes.

Biography
Persili was a resident of Milan. Among her masterworks are: La Sonno a Caprino; Lecco da Olginate; Veduta di Lecco; Lago di Como; L'Adda; Casolare; Pianura lombarda, and Val della Sonna. She exhibited in some Italian Exhibitions, among them the Promotrice of Florence, and the 1884 Turin Exhibition and other expositions at Rome.

References

19th-century Italian painters
Italian women painters
Italian landscape painters
Painters from Milan
19th-century Italian women artists